Aq Bolagh-e Aqajan Khan (also Romanized as Āq Bolāgh-e Āqājān Khān; also known as Āgh Bolāgh (آغ بُلاغ), Āgh Bolāgh-e Moşţafá Khān (آغ بُلاغِ مُصطَفَى خان), and Āq Bolāgh-e Āqājān - آق بُلاغِ آقاجان) is a village in Sharqi Rural District, in the Central District of Ardabil County, Ardabil Province, Iran. At the 2006 census, its population was 1,802 in 384 families.

References 

Towns and villages in Ardabil County